Guillermo Amor Martínez (born 4 December 1967) is a Spanish retired footballer who played as a versatile midfielder.

After spending most of his professional career with Barcelona, winning several accolades in a ten-year tenure, he ended it in Scotland with Livingston. Over 12 seasons, he amassed La Liga totals of 375 matches and 48 goals.

Amor won nearly 40 caps for Spain during the 1990s, representing the nation in one World Cup and one European Championship.

Playing career

Club
Born in Benidorm, Alicante, Valencian Community, Amor was a product of FC Barcelona's youth academy, and made his first-team debut in the 1988–89 season under Johan Cruyff, going on to become one of the Catalan team's most influential players as they achieved four consecutive La Liga titles and the 1991–92 European Cup (he did not play in the final against U.C. Sampdoria, however, after being booked in the last group stage match with S.L. Benfica). In 1993–94, as the club conquered the last of a successive four leagues, he appeared in all games except one, scoring a career-best eight goals. Additionally, on 5 April 1990, he opened the scoring in the Copa del Rey final against Real Madrid, helping to a 2–0 win at the Mestalla Stadium.

Amor left Barça at the end of the 1997–98 campaign, with another national championship won, deemed surplus to requirements by new manager Louis van Gaal as longtime teammate Albert Ferrer, having played 421 matches overall only behind club greats Xavi, Migueli and Carles Rexach. He subsequently had his first abroad experience, appearing sparingly for Serie A side ACF Fiorentina over two years and then returning to Spain with Villarreal CF as the latter had just returned to the top division.

Amor retired from football after a short spell with Scotland's Livingston, for which he signed in January 2003, making his debut on the 28th in a 3–1 away victory over Partick Thistle. The Livi Lions eventually narrowly avoided relegation from the Premier League.

International
Amor represented Spain on 37 occasions, scoring four goals. His debut came in an UEFA Euro 1992 qualifier 2–3 loss in Czechoslovakia on 14 November 1990, and he went on to appear for the nation at both the Euro 1996 and the 1998 FIFA World Cup. In the former competition, on 18 June, he scored against Romania in a 2–1 win, netting in the 84th minute and helping the team to the quarter-finals in England.

Amor's last cap was a sour one, as Spain were downed by lowly Cyprus on 5 September 1998 in a Euro 2000 qualifier (3–2).

Coaching career
After retiring, Amor served a four-year spell at former club Barcelona, being responsible for the youth categories after Joan Laporta was named president in 2003. He left after the board of directors decided not to renew his contract, but returned in July 2010 as technical director of football training.

In late August 2014, Amor was invited to Australia by one of his former colleagues and friend, former Barcelona youth academy coach and manager of Adelaide United FC, Josep Gombau. He spent a month observing and consulting the latter with Adelaide's training, after which he signed a one-year contract to become the technical director.

On 24 July 2015, following the resignation of Gombau due to family reasons, Amor was appointed as head coach prior to the start of the season. He only achieved his first win on the ninth matchday, in a 1–0 win against Perth Glory FC, but went on to lead the team to a club-record 13 clean sheets, including being unbeaten in the last ten home games and winning the last four away.

Amor led Adelaide to the double on 1 May 2016, after a 3–1 defeat of Western Sydney Wanderers FC in the Grand Final. On 10 May of the following year he left the Hindmarsh Stadium, returning to Barcelona as head of youth football alongside former teammate José Mari Bakero.

Personal life
On 16 December 2007, Amor was involved in a serious traffic collision while travelling from Valencia. Released from hospital after only a week, he later fully recovered.

Amor's son, also called Guillermo (born 2001), played youth football in England with Leeds United.

Career statistics

Club

International goals

Honours

Player
Barcelona
La Liga: 1990–91, 1991–92, 1992–93, 1993–94, 1997–98
Copa del Rey: 1989–90, 1996–97, 1997–98
Supercopa de España: 1991, 1992, 1994, 1996
European Cup: 1991–92
UEFA Cup Winners' Cup: 1988–89, 1996–97
UEFA Super Cup: 1992, 1997

Manager
Adelaide United
A-League Premiership: 2015–16
A-League Championship: 2016

Individual
A-League Coach of the Year: 2015–16
PFA Manager of the Year: 2015–16

Managerial statistics

References

External links
 
 FC Barcelona profile
 
 

1967 births
Living people
People from Benidorm
Sportspeople from the Province of Alicante
Spanish footballers
Footballers from the Valencian Community
Association football midfielders
La Liga players
Segunda División players
FC Barcelona Atlètic players
FC Barcelona players
Villarreal CF players
Serie A players
ACF Fiorentina players
Scottish Premier League players
Livingston F.C. players
Spain youth international footballers
Spain under-21 international footballers
Spain international footballers
UEFA Euro 1996 players
1998 FIFA World Cup players
Catalonia international guest footballers
Spanish expatriate footballers
Expatriate footballers in Italy
Expatriate footballers in Scotland
Spanish expatriate sportspeople in Italy
Spanish expatriate sportspeople in Scotland
Spanish football managers
Adelaide United FC managers
Spanish expatriate football managers
Expatriate soccer managers in Australia
Spanish expatriate sportspeople in Australia
FC Barcelona non-playing staff